The Betting and Gaming Act 1960 was a British Act of Parliament that legalised additional forms of gambling in the United Kingdom. It was passed on 1 September 1960 and came into effect on 1 January 1961.

The Act
Based on the recommendations of the Royal Commission on Betting, Lotteries and Gaming, 1949–51, the act came into force on 1 January 1961 and first allowed gambling for small sums in games of skill such as bridge. From May 1961 betting shops were allowed to open.

Until 1965 about 16,000 licences were granted by local magistrates.

Aim
The aim was to take gambling off the street and end the practice of runners (employed by bookmakers) collecting from punters, a move welcomed by the clergy. Fines would be imposed at a later date on any street gambling.

Consequences
The opening of betting shops affected the greyhound racing industry in the United Kingdom with attendances suffering throughout Britain. From 1961–1969 there were 21 National Greyhound Racing Club (NGRC) registered track closures and many independent (unaffiliated to a governing body) track closures. The act is regarded as one of the primary reasons for the decline of greyhound racing with 91 NGRC track closures alone recorded from 1960–2010.

See also
 History of gambling in the United Kingdom

References

External links
 Mentions of the Betting and Gaming Act 1960 in Hansard.
 

United Kingdom Acts of Parliament 1960
1961 in the United Kingdom
Gambling in the United Kingdom